Giv Gud en chance om søndagen is a 1970 Danish film. The title is Danish for "Give God a chance on Sunday".

It stars Ulf Pilgaard, Ove Sprogøe and Lotte Tarp.

Cast
Ulf Pilgaard – Rev. Niels Riesing
Lotte Tarp – Hanne Riesing
Vibeke Reumert – Hanne's Mother
Ove Sprogøe – Præst ved Roskilde Domkirke
Ole Storm – Thorsen
Rachel Bæklund – Fru Thorsen
Erik Nørgaard – Lærer Petersen
Ebbe Kløvedal Reich – Himself
Erik Halskov-Jensen – Arbejder I grusgrav
Annelise Halskov-Jensen – Arbejderens kone
Knud Jansen – Rideskoleeje
Leif Mønsted – Vækkelsesprædikant
Niels Ufer – Teolog
Jørgen Schleimann – Teolog
Arne Skovhus – Teolog
Johannes Møllehave – Teolog
Karl Andersen – Stoffer
Vilhelm Rigels – Organist
Henrik Stangerup – Kistebærer
Ole Michelsen
Pernille Kløvedal

External links
 Giv gud en chance om søndagen (1970) IMDB page (English)

References

1970s Danish-language films
Danish drama films
1970 films